Carterton Football Club is a football club based in Carterton, Oxfordshire, England.

History
The club was founded in 1918, and initially played in the Witney & District League. They won the Premier Division title in 1960–61 and 1965–66. In 1976–77 the club were Division One champions. In 1982 the club was taken over by the Carterton Boys club and was renamed Carterton Town. After winning the Division One title again in 1984–85, they won the Oxfordshire Junior Cup in 1985–86. The club then moved up to Division One of the Hellenic League. After winning Division One in 1989–90 the club were promoted to the Premier Division.

Carterton were relegated back to Division One at the end of the 1991–92 season, but won the division again in 1993–94 to return to the Premier Division. In 1998–99 they finished as Premier Division runners-up, and went on to win the league's Supplementary Cup in 1999–2000 and the Challenge Cup in 2000–01. In 2005 the club reverted to the name Carterton Football Club. They remained in the Premier Division until being relegated to Division One West at the end of the 2010–11 season. Although they won Division One West in 2015–16 and were promoted to the Premier Division, the club withdrew from the league in September 2016 after their manager resigned and several players left. They returned to Division Two West of the league the following season.

After a fourth-place finish in Division Two West in 2017–18, Carterton moved up to Division One West. However, they resigned from the league after three matches the following season. The club was subsequently placed in the Premier Division of the Witney & District League for the 2019–20 season.

Ground
The club originally played at Alvescot Road Recreation Ground. During the 1984–85 season they moved to Kilkenny Lane, which was officially opened by Lou Macari and Jim Smith in March 1985.

Honours
Hellenic League
Division One champions 1989–90, 1993–94
Division One West champions 2015–16
Challenge Cup winners 2000–01
Supplementary Cup winners 1999–2000
Witney & District League
Premier Division champions 1960–61, 1965–66
Division One champions 1976–77, 1984–85
George Dingle Memorial Cup winners 1966–67, 1967–68, 1976–77, 1982–83, 1984–85
Oxfordshire Junior Shield
Winners 1985–86

Records
Best FA Cup performance: Second qualifying round, 2000–01
Best FA Vase performance: Third round, 2000–01
Most goals: Phil Rodney
Record attendance: 650 vs Swindon Town, friendly match, July 2001

See also
Carterton F.C. players
Carterton F.C. managers

References

External links
Official website

 
Football clubs in England
Football clubs in Oxfordshire
Association football clubs established in 1918
1918 establishments in England
Witney and District League
Hellenic Football League